Burl Tamayo Toler III (born April 7, 1983) is a former Arena football wide receiver. He was originally signed by the Oakland Raiders as an undrafted free agent in 2006. He played college football at Cal. He is currently the wide receivers coach for the Cal Bears.

Early years
Toler attended Bishop O'Dowd High School. He helped his team win the league championship in his sophomore and junior years and won the NCS Championship during his sophomore season. He earned First-team All-League on offense and defense as a senior. He also lettered in track all four years and attended the League of Champions meet in his final three years.

College career
Toler, like his father was a walk-on at Cal. As a senior, he was the team's leading receiver with 61 receptions for 795 yards (13.0 avg.) and three touchdowns.

Professional career

National Football League (2006)
Toler went unselected in the 2006 NFL Draft. Later, he was signed as an undrafted free agent by the Oakland Raiders on May 10, 2006. He spent all of training camp and the preseason with the Raiders. He was signed to their practice squad on September 4, 2006. However, the team released him on September 12, 2006.

Arena Football League (2007)
In late 2006, Toler signed with the San Jose SaberCats of the Arena Football League. However, he never played for them as he played for the Cologne Centurions of NFL Europe.

National Football League (2007)
In 2007, Toler signed with the Washington Redskins and spent training camp and the preseason with the team before being released on September 1, 2007. Two days later, he signed to the team's practice squad. However, he was released again on September 11, only to be re-signed on November 13. He was released again, a week later. He was then re-signed to the Redskins practice squad on November 28, and spent the rest of the season there.

Arena Football League (2008–present)
Toler then re-joined the SaberCats, however he did not play for them in 2008, as he re-signed with the Redskins on January 9, 2008, and spent the AFL season at the Redskins training camp. He was released by the Redskins again on August 20, 2008.

On September 22, 2008, Toler was activated by the SaberCats.

On April 8, 2009, Toler signed a short-term deal with the Bologna Doves of the Italian Football League.

Personal
Toler's father, Burl Jr., was also a walk-on at Cal and a two-year starter at linebacker in the mid-1970s. His grandfather, Burl Toler, was an All-American at the University of San Francisco in 1951 and later became the National Football League’s first African-American official. After being released by the Washington Redskins, Toler III was a substitute teacher.

Toler and his wife, Drea, have a daughter named Laleaga and a son named Burl IV.

Notes

External links
 Cal Bears bio
 Washington Redskins bio

1983 births
Living people
Players of American football from Berkeley, California
American football wide receivers
California Golden Bears football players
Oakland Raiders players
Washington Redskins players
San Jose SaberCats players
Orlando Predators players
San Antonio Talons players
California Golden Bears football coaches
Fresno State Bulldogs football coaches
UC Davis Aggies football coaches